Tarauacá is a municipality located in the northwest of the Brazilian state of Acre. Tarauacá has a population of 43,151 people and has an area .

Conservation

The municipality contains 38% of the Alto Tarauacá Extractive Reserve, created in 2000.
It contains the  Rio Gregório State Forest, a sustainable use conservation unit created in 2004.
It also contains the  Mogno State Forest and the  Rio Liberdade State Forest, two other sustainable use units created on the same date.

Economy 
In 2017, Tarauacá had per capita GDP of 11.763,89 R$, total revenue of 71.657.950 R$, and total expenses of 63.519.410 R$.

Climate

Transportation
Tarauacá is served by José Galera dos Santos Airport.

References

Municipalities in Acre (state)